Fastest Car is a Netflix original series which premiered on April 6, 2018. It is a reality-show where drivers of stock exotic supercars go up against sleeper cars in a quarter-mile drag race. Supercars include a Lamborghini Aventador, Lamborghini Huracán, Ford GT, Ferrari 458, Ferrari 488, Dodge Viper, McLaren MP4, McLaren 675LT, McLaren 650S, and McLaren 720S.
 
The series, which serves as Netflix's first global automotive series, was created by Scott Weintrob and produced by Conde Nast Entertainment and Large Eyes for the streaming service.

Executive producers of the show include Al Edgington, Joe LaBracio, Dawn Ostroff, Scott Weintrob, and Jeremy Finn.

On August 14, 2018, Netflix renewed the series for a second season. The second season launched on September 20, 2019, and features seven episodes. Al Edgington, Joe LaBracio, Scott Weintrob, and Jeremy Finn returned as executive producers.

Premise
In each episode, there are three sleeper cars going up against one supercar in a quarter-mile drag race. The winners of each episode get to move on to the championship race at the end of the season.

Episodes

Series overview

Supercars are in bold.

Season 1 (2018)

Notes

Championship (2018)

Season 2 (2019)

Championship (2019)

Notes

Production

Filming

Season 1
Barstow-Daggett Airport in San Bernardino County, California, served as the drag strip for episodes 1, 2, 5, and 7. Caddo Mills, Texas, was the filming location in episode 3. Calverton Executive Airpark in Calverton, New York, was used as the drag strip in episode 4. Coleman A. Young International Airport in Detroit, Michigan, was used as the drag strip in episode 6. El Mirage Lake dry lake bed in the Mojave Desert, within San Bernardino County, California, served as the drag strip for the championship in episode 8.

Season 2
Sebring International Raceway in Sebring, Florida, served as the drag strip in episode 1. The decommissioned airfield at Marine Corps Air Station El Toro near Irvine, California, served as the drag strip in episode 2, 4, 5, and the championship in episode 7. Greenville, South Carolina, was the filming location for episode 3 and 6.

References

External links
 
 

English-language Netflix original programming
2018 American television series debuts
2010s American reality television series